Kálmán Kulcsár (27 June 1928 – 4 September 2010) was a Hungarian politician and jurist, who served as Minister of Justice between 1988 and 1990. He was the father of the sociology of law in Hungary. He served as the last chairman of the Patriotic People's Front until 1990 and after that as Hungarian ambassador to Canada.

Publications
A szociológiai gondolkodás fejlődése (1966, 1972)
A jogszociológia alapjai (1976)
Rechtssoziologische Abhandlungen (1980)
Gazdaság, társadalom, jog (1982)
Contemporary Hungarian Society (1984)
A modernizáció és a magyar társadalom (1986)
Politika és jogszociológia (1987)
Modernizáció és jog (1989, angolul 1992)
Political Culture – Legal Culture (1991)
Két világ között 1988–1990 (1994)
A jog szerepe a társadalmi változásokban – a jog változása (1995)
A politikai rendszer és a magyar valóság (1997)
A politikatudomány arcai (co-author, 1999)
Globális és regionális integráció politikai hatása (2004)
Az új politikai rendszer és a magyar valóság (2006, in English too)
Kína a világpolitikában. Az átalakuló Kína (2007)
India, az útkereső birodalom (2008)

References
 MTI Ki Kicsoda 2009, Magyar Távirati Iroda Zrt., Budapest, 2008, 644. old., 
 Szakmai életrajz az MTA Politikatudományi Intézetének honlapján
 Kulcsár Kálmán adatlapja az MTA honlapján
 Cikk a Mozgó Világ c. folyóiratban
 Elhunyt Kulcsár Kálmán

1928 births
2010 deaths
Justice ministers of Hungary
Ambassadors of Hungary to Canada